The Humane Order of African Redemption, an order presented by the government of Liberia, was founded on January 13, 1879 during the presidency of Anthony W. Gardiner. It is awarded for humanitarian work in Liberia, for acts supporting and assisting the Liberian nation and to individuals who have played a prominent role in the emancipation of African Americans and the pursuit of equal rights.

The Order replaced the older Liberian "Lone Star Medal".

The three grades of the Order are:

* Grand Commander: The Grand Commander wears a wide ribbon on the right shoulder and the star of the Order on the left.

* Knight Commander: The Knight Commander, wears a ribbon around the neck and a smaller but otherwise identical star.

* Officer: The Officer wears a narrow ribbon with rosette on the left.

The Regalia of the Order
The medallion is a white enamel five pointed star with five gold balls on the points and golden rays between the arms. On the front of the star is the Coat of Arms of Liberia. On the reverse, the image of black people praying with broken chains under a cross with the motto "The love of liberty brought us here". The ribbon is red with one blue and three white stripes.

Recipients 

 Marian Anderson
 A. Doris Banks Henries 
 Sepp Blatter
 Edward Wilmot Blyden 
 Anna E. Cooper
 Varney Ebrima Dempster
 Ijoma Robert Flemister
 James Walter Flemister
 Francis Gbassagee
 Billy Graham
 Asa Grant Hilliard
 Marjon Kamara
 Jacques Paul Klein
 Ellen Margrethe Løj 
 H.T. Maclin
 Francois Eugene Massaquoi
 Gordon Mellish, missionary with Baptist Mid-Missions
 Mary Lee Mills
 Hendrik Pieter Nicolaas Muller
 Dougbeh Chris Nyan
 George Thomas Reffell 
 Solomon Sipply
 David Meserve Thomas 
 Alex J. Tyler 
 George Toe Washington
 Arsène Wenger
 Claude Le Roy
 Cletus Wotorson
 Suraj Abdurrahman
 Kimmie Weeks

References

External links
 Humane Order of African Redemption, Officer
 ODM of Liberia: Order of African Redemption
 Order of African Redemption, Commander - The OMSA Medal Database

Humane Order of African Redemption
Awards established in 1879
1879 establishments in Africa